Sedgwick is a village and civil parish in Cumbria, England,  south of Kendal. In the 2001 census the parish had a population of 380, decreasing at the 2011 census to 349.

Part of the historic county of Westmorland, its main points of interest are 2 Grade II listed buildings:
 Sedgwick House, built in 1868 by Paley and Austin for the industrialist William Henry Wakefield
 An aqueduct belonging to the drained section of the Lancaster Canal
Sizergh Castle & Garden and Levens Hall are just west of the village.

The gunpowder works in Sedgwick, powered by water from the River Kent, operated to 1935. From 1819 the works had access to the Lancaster Canal, and they were probably the cause of the rapid expansion of the village in the Victorian era.

The Lakeland Maze Farm Park is situated to the east of the village.

See also

Listed buildings in Sedgwick, Cumbria

References

External links

 Cumbria County History Trust: Sedgwick (nb: provisional research only – see Talk page)
Visit Cumbria Page on Sedgwick
British History Page on Sedgwick
Sedgwick.org

Sedgwick, Cumbria
Sedgwick, Cumbria
Civil parishes in Cumbria